William Lorimer (April 27, 1861September 13, 1934) was an American Republican politician who represented Illinois in the United States House of Representatives and United States Senate. In 1912, however, the Senate expelled Lorimer, holding that his election was invalid due to his use of corrupt methods and practices including bribery of state legislators. Lorimer was known as the "Blond Boss" of Chicago.

Biography
Lorimer was born in Manchester, England. His family immigrated to the United States in 1866, first settling in Michigan and then moving to Chicago in 1870. Lorimer was self-educated. He had been apprenticed to a sign painter when he was ten. He worked in the Chicago meat-packing houses and for a street railroad company.

In 1894, Lorimer was elected to the first of two non-consecutive tenures (1895-1901, 1903–09) in the US House of Representatives. In 1909, he helped to engineer the blocking of the re-election of US Senator Albert J. Hopkins, a Republican who had been Lorimer's ally, but was now a political foe. With Hopkins' re-election bid finished, Lorimer seemed surprised when a coalition of 55 Illinois State House Republicans and 53 State House Democrats pushed his name to fill the now-vacant seat in the US Senate.  At the time, US Senators were elected by state legislatures. Lorimer's name went before the State Senate, and after a contentious campaign, he was elected to the US Senate. He took his seat in March 1909.

In 1910, The Chicago Tribune published an admission by Charles A. White, a Democratic member of the Illinois House of Representatives, that Lorimer had paid $1,000 for White's vote in the that election.

On July 13, 1912, after two Senate investigations and acrimonious debate, the US Senate adopted a resolution declaring "that corrupt methods and practices were employed in his election, and that the election, therefore, was invalid." Lorimer was expelled from office.

Many in Chicago believed that Lorimer's ouster was politically inspired and that he was wrongfully deprived of his seat. Such corruption nationwide led to the passage in May 1912, of the Seventeenth Amendment to the US Constitution, providing for direct election of U.S. Senators.
  
When he returned to Chicago he was greeted by a parade and a throng at a meeting in Orchestra Hall.  One of the speakers at the meeting was attorney Charles Lederer of Adler & Lederer (now known as Arnstein & Lehr, LLP) and a former member of the Illinois General Assembly.  He presented a resolution to the meeting reciting the wrong done to Mr. Lorimer, his fight for his seat and the faith of his friends in him.

Lorimer served as president of La Salle Street Trust & Savings Bank from 1910 to 1915, and then entered the lumber business.  He died in Chicago at age 73, and was buried at Calvary Cemetery in Evanston.

See also
 List of federal political scandals in the United States
 List of United States senators born outside the United States

References

Further reading
Tarr, Joel Arthur A Study in Boss Politics: William Lorimer of Chicago 1971 University of Illinois Press

External links

 The William Lorimer Papers are held at the University of Illinois at Urbana-Champaign.

|-

|-

1861 births
1934 deaths
British emigrants to the United States
Burials at Calvary Cemetery (Evanston, Illinois)
Illinois politicians convicted of crimes
Members of the United States Senate declared not entitled to their seat
Politicians from Chicago
Politicians from Manchester
Republican Party members of the United States House of Representatives from Illinois
Republican Party United States senators from Illinois